Bilal Shah (born 24 March 1998) is a Pakistani cricketer. He made his List A debut for Pakistan International Airlines in the 2016–17 Departmental One Day Cup on 19 December 2016. He made his first-class debut for Habib Bank Limited in the 2017–18 Quaid-e-Azam Trophy on 15 October 2017.

References

External links
 

1998 births
Living people
Pakistani cricketers
Pakistan International Airlines cricketers
People from Mardan District